The Central School is a historic Rosenwald School building located in the historically African-American East Side neighborhood at Asheboro, Randolph County, North Carolina.  It was built in 1926, and is a one-story, "T"-plan red brick building with a gable roof.  In 1948, a two-level, flat roofed International Style wing was added.

It was added to the National Register of Historic Places in 1993.

References

Rosenwald schools in North Carolina
School buildings on the National Register of Historic Places in North Carolina
International style architecture in North Carolina
School buildings completed in 1926
Buildings and structures in Randolph County, North Carolina
Asheboro, North Carolina
National Register of Historic Places in Randolph County, North Carolina
1926 establishments in North Carolina